Apamea inficita, the lined Quaker is a moth of the family Noctuidae. The species was first described by Francis Walker in 1857. It is native to North America, where it can be found from Newfoundland west to British Columbia, north to the Yukon and the Northwest Territories, and south to Colorado.

The wingspan is 34–36 mm. The moth is rusty or yellowish brown, or sometimes pinkish in color. It has a darkened spot on the forewings and a disc-shaped spot on the hindwings. The moth flies from July to August depending on the location.

Subspecies
Apamea inficita conradi (Grote, 1879)
Apamea inficita indela (Smith, 1910)
Apamea inficita inficita
Apamea inficita lineosa

References

External links

Apamea (moth)
Moths of North America
Moths described in 1857